Schlaube Valley Nature Park is a nature park and reserve in the state of Brandenburg, Germany. It was established on December 27, 1995.

External links

Nature parks in Brandenburg
Protected areas established in 1995